The Jericho Covered Bridge is a Burr arch through truss wooden covered bridge near Jerusalem, Harford County and Kingsville, Baltimore County, in Maryland, United States and near historic Jerusalem Mill Village. The bridge was constructed in 1865 across the Little Gunpowder Falls.

The Jericho Covered Bridge was listed on the National Register of Historic Places in 1978.

There are also rumors the bridge is 'haunted' by the ghosts of civil war soldiers. The bridge is believed to be a site where former Civil War soldiers committed suicide.

Renovations 
Renovations were made to the original bridge in 1937 and 1982. The bridge also underwent renovations during the summer of 2015.

See also
List of bridges on the National Register of Historic Places in Maryland

References

External links

Jericho Covered Bridge in Baltimore County and Harford County Maryland
, including photo in 1983, at Maryland Historical Trust

Covered bridges on the National Register of Historic Places in Maryland
Wooden bridges in Maryland
Bridges in Baltimore County, Maryland
Bridges in Harford County, Maryland
Road bridges in Maryland
Historic American Buildings Survey in Maryland
National Register of Historic Places in Baltimore County, Maryland
National Register of Historic Places in Harford County, Maryland
Burr Truss bridges in the United States